Somewhere Only We Know is a 2015 Chinese romantic drama film directed by Xu Jinglei. Filming took place in Prague, Czech Republic. The film was released on February 10, 2015.

Plot
Jin Tian (Wang Likun) is a young woman who recently got dumped by her fiancé and lost her grandmother, Chen Lanxin (Xu Jinglei). Feeling heartbroken, she enrolls in a language course abroad and travels to Prague for a change of pace, the city where her grandmother once spent a couple years of her life. In her grandmother's belongings, she finds a letter from 1970, written by Josef Novak, her grandmother's past lover.

In Prague, Jin Tian meets Peng Zeyang (Kris Wu), a young single father who lives with his little daughter and bipolar mother. The two develop a mutual attraction during their journey searching for Josef Novak.

Cast
Kris Wu as Peng Zeyang
Wang Likun as Jin Tian
Xu Jinglei as Chen Lanxin
Gordon Alexander as Josef Novak
Cong Shan as Zeyang's Mom
Sophia Cai Shuya as Ni Ni, Zeyang's daughter
Juck Zhang as Luo Ji
Re Yizha as Shanshan

Production
Principal photography started in June 2014 in Prague and ended in August 2014.

Box office
In mainland China, the film grossed US$37.81 million in its first six days debuting at No. 1 at the box office.

References

External links
 

2015 films
2015 romantic drama films
Films directed by Xu Jinglei
Chinese romantic drama films
Films shot in the Czech Republic
Heyi Pictures films